The Canton Carnegie Library, at 225 E. 4th St. in Canton, South Dakota, was built in 1913.  It was listed on the National Register of Historic Places in 2016.

It is a raised one-story building with basement built of brick with sandstone trim, upon a concrete foundation.

It was designed by Huron, South Dakota architect George Issenhuth.

References

Carnegie libraries in South Dakota
National Register of Historic Places in Lincoln County, South Dakota
Library buildings completed in 1913